USS Picket (YAGR/AGR-7) was a , converted from a Liberty Ship, acquired by the US Navy in 1955. She was obtained from the National Defense Reserve Fleet and reconfigured as a radar picket ship and assigned to radar picket duty in the North Pacific Ocean as part of the Distant Early Warning Line.

Construction
Picket (YAGR-7) was laid down 28 March 1945, under a Maritime Commission (MARCOM) contract, MC hull 3138, as the Liberty Ship James F. Harrell, by J.A. Jones Construction, Panama City, Florida. She was launched 17 May 1945, sponsored by Mrs. Alice Harrell, and delivered to Alcoa Steamship Lines for merchant marine service 11 June 1945.

Service history

Merchant service
As a merchant ship, James F. Harrell served Alcoa Steamship Lines from June to October 1945. Following assignment to the National Defense Reserve Fleet, James River, Virginia, 6 October 1945 to 31 January 1947, she served United States Navigation Company, Baltimore, Maryland, January 1947 to August 1948. Her next merchant duty was for Boland and Cornelius Company, New York, August 1948. James F. Harrell remained in the National Defense Reserve Fleet, Wilmington, North Carolina, from 29 August 1948 to 11 July 1955.

US Navy service
Acquired by the US Navy on 12 July 1955, and renamed Picket, the merchant ship was towed to the Norfolk Navy Yard, Portsmouth, Virginia, for conversion to station ship YAGR-7. She was commissioned on 8 February 1956. She was reclassified AGR-7 on 28 September 1958.

From 1956 to 1965, Picket used her long range radar and communications equipment to serve the North American Air Defense Command. She provided vital radar information on seaward air approaches to the Pacific coast. Her sea tours usually included 30 to 35 days at sea, followed by 15 to 30 days in San Francisco, California, between patrols.

Decommissioning
Struck from the Naval Vessel Register on 1 September 1965, Picket joined the Maritime Administration Reserve Fleet, Suisun Bay, San Francisco, California, until sold for scrapping in 1978.

Military awards and honors
Scanners crew was eligible for the following medals:
 National Defense Service Medal

References

Bibliography

External links 
 

 

Liberty ships
Ships built in Panama City, Florida
1945 ships
World War II merchant ships of the United States
Guardian-class radar picket ships
Cold War auxiliary ships of the United States
James River Reserve Fleet
Wilmington Reserve Fleet
Suisun Bay Reserve Fleet